M. Ahmad Chaudhry is an American radiologist, Associate Professor at the University of Vermont, and Interim Associate Dean for Research, in the College of Nursing and Health Sciences.

He received a Ph.D. degree in molecular biology from the University of Manchester, UK. He did postdoctoral research work at the University of Alberta in Canada, before joining the University of Pennsylvania as a Senior Research Investigator. His research interests are micro-RNA responses to radiation exposure, radiation-induced bystander effect, cell cycle perturbations and the enzymatic processing of clustered DNA damage.

Education 
 Ph.D., University of Manchester, UK, Molecular Biology, 1990
 M.Sc., University of Manchester, UK, Molecular Biology, 1987

Research Interests 
 Radiation Biology
 DNA repair
 Micro-RNA

The role of micro-RNA in the cellular response to radiation treatment 
Ionizing radiation interferes with cellular functions at all levels of cell organization. The ionizing radiation-induced stress response is very complex and involves many cellular processes. Dr. Chaudry is investigating the involvement of small non-coding micro-RNA in the response of human cells exposed to ionizing radiation. Micro RNAs (miRNAs) are small non-protein-coding single-stranded RNAs of ~22 nucleotides that function as negative gene regulators. miRNA negatively regulate their targets either by binding with perfect or nearly perfect complementarity to protein coding mRNA sequences to induce the RNA-mediated interference (RNAi) pathway. Most miRNAs do not cleave their mRNA targets as a mechanism of gene regulation. These miRNAs bind to imperfect complementary sites within the 3′ untranslated regions (UTRs) of their mRNA targets. In this case the target-gene repression occurs post-transcriptionally at the level of translation resulting in reduced protein levels but the mRNA levels remain unaffected. A single miRNA has the capability to bind to as many as 200 diverse gene targets ranging from transcription factors, secreted factors, receptors and transporters, thus potentially controlling the expression of about one-third of human mRNAs. Research has identified cell type specific modulation of several miRNA in gamma radiation and X-ray-treated human cells. Other studies from our laboratory showed that the expression of many miRNA markedly differ within the same cell line after exposure to either low or high doses of radiation. His work also identified radiation-induced modulation of miRNA in cells with altered DNA repair capability. These studies have provided evidence that miRNA are involved in the response to ionizing radiation exposure in human cells.

Selected publications
Chaudhry, M. A., Kreger, B. and Omaruddin, R. A. (2010). Transcriptional modulation of micro-RNA in human cells differing in radiation sensitivity. International Journal of Radiation Biology. 86: 569-583.
Chaudhry, M. A., Sachdeva, H. and Omaruddin, R. A. (2010). Radiation-induced micro-RNA modulation in glioblastoma cells differing in DNA-repair pathways. DNA and Cell Biology. 29: 553-561.
Omaruddin, R. A. and Chaudhry, M.A. (2010). Detection of genomic DNA methylation with Denaturing High-Performance Liquid Chromatography. Human Cell. 23: 41-49. (Abstract)
Chaudhry, M.A. (2009). Real-time PCR analysis of Micro-RNA expression in ionizing radiation treated cells. Cancer Biotherapy & Radiopharmaceuticals. 24: 49-56
Chaudhry, M.A. (2008). Analysis of gene expression in normal and cancer cells exposed to g-radiation. J Biomed. Biotech. 2008: 541678.
Chaudhry, M.A.(2008). Biomarkers for human radiation exposure. J Biomed Sci. 15: 557-563.
Chaudhry, M.A. (2007). Base excision repair of ionizing radiation-induced DNA damage in G1 and G2 cell cycle phases. Cancer Cell Int. 7:15.
Yang, N., Chaudhry, M.A., Wallace, S. S. (2006). Base Excision Repair by hNTH1 and hOGG1: A Two Edged Sword in the Processing of DNA Damage in g-irradiated Human Cells. DNA Repair 5: 43-51.
Chaudhry, M.A.(2006). Bystander effect: Biological endpoints and microarray analysis. Mutation Research 597:98-112.
Chaudhry, M.A.(2006). "An exercise to estimate differential gene expression in human cells". Biochem Mol Biol Edu 34: 116-120.

References

External links
Google scholar

Living people
Alumni of the University of Manchester
University of Alberta alumni
University of Pennsylvania faculty
Year of birth missing (living people)